The Office of Environmental Health Hazard Assessment, commonly referred to as OEHHA (pronounced oh-EEE-ha), is a specialized department within the cabinet-level California Environmental Protection Agency (CalEPA) with responsibility for evaluating health risks from environmental chemical contaminants.

OEHHA is the scientific adviser within CalEPA and provides the health effects assessments that assist regulatory decision makers within CalEPA, the California Department of Public Health, and other agencies and non-governmental organizations (see below). This includes assessing health and environmental risks from:
 Carcinogens
 Reproductive toxins
 Air pollutants
 Pesticides
 Chemical contaminants in food and water
 Chemical exposures in the workplace
 Climate change in California

In the news

Attempted closure 
In May 2009, Governor Arnold Schwarzenegger proposed to "eliminate and transfer the functions" of OEHHA (and other agencies) as part his May Revise for the 2009–2010 budget.  Details about the transfer of functions including mandates, funding, staff resources, and new head agency are limited. Elimination of OEHHA will have a very minor impact on the budget problems because of several reasons: (1) OEHHA's budget is very small (1/500th of 1% of the General Fund, or 1/50,000th) compared to the state deficit; $8.3 million of OEHHA's budget is general fund (2) about half of OEHHA's budget is funded by special funds (e.g. Proposition 65, Biomonitoring) (3) state mandates that transfer to other agencies or departments will still require funding.

By an executive order from the Governor in February 2009, all state workers are on a two-day-a-month furlough, or two days off without pay, equivalent to a 10% pay cut. On May 28, 2009 Governor Schwarzenegger proposed an additional 5% pay cut for all state workers (without an adjustment to the number of days worked), resulting a total pay cut of 15%; this additional cut must be approved by the legislature.

Press 
Many have questioned the Governor's motivation for cutting OEHHA. Some have proposed this cut was spearheaded by industries who have been in conflict with OEHHA and several industries have been proposed as "suspects." An international petition to save OEHHA, titled "Doctors and Scientists for Environmental Health", has also been circulating and has over 200 signatures from California, the U.S. and over 20 other countries worldwide.

On June 2, 2009 articles and editorials/opinions were published in the Los Angeles Times, Sacramento Bee, California Progress Report, SFGate and others that speak to the importance of OEHHA and further explain how cutting OEHHA would not save a significant source of funding.  These timely articles coincide with the California Budget Conference Committee hearings, with public testimony, that occurred on the afternoon of June 2, 2009.

Budget Conference Committee Hearing 
On June 2, 2009 the Budget Conference Committee convened a hearing for public comment on the Governor's budget proposal. The hearing is archived on video, the testimony on behalf of OEHHA begins at 3:49:11  The supporters of OEHHA proposed and alternative to keep OEHHA intact and save $8.3 million, OEHHA's general fund budget.  The proposal includes alternative funding sources and also expands OEHHA with the addition of Department Pesticide Regulation's risk assessment activities, Department of Toxic Substances Control's hazard evaluation functions, and lead roles in the children's health initiative and the Cal/EPA portion of the biomonitoring program. The main argument against the Governor's proposal is that the science performed in OEHHA should be independent of policy decisions made by the other boards and departments of Cal/EPA.  Further, in the governor's proposal, many of OEHHA's programs would be dropped entirely (e.g. the Public Health Goals for drinking water contaminants).

Speakers in support of OEHHA included:
Gina Solomon, MD, Natural Resources Defense Council senior scientist and UCSF faculty
John Froines, Ph.D., UCLA School of Public Health
John Balmes, MD, UCSF and UC Berkeley faculty, Director of UC Berkeley Northern California Center for Occupational Health
Janice Kim, MD, Ph.D., MPH, representing American Academy of Pediatrics
Julia Quint, Ph.D., retired chief of Hazard Evaluation System and Information Service of the California Department of Public Health
Martha Guzman Aceves, MS, California Rural Legal Assistance Foundation
Suzanne Murphy, Executive Director of Worksafe
David Chatfield, Executive Director of Californians for Pesticide Reform
Bill Magavern, JD, Director of Sierra Club California
Renee Sharp, MS, Environmental Working Group
Bill Allayaud, MRP, Director of Government Affairs for Environmental Working Group
Bonnie Holmes-Gen, Senior Policy Director, American Lung Association
Kyle Gardner, Center for Environmental Health
Donne Brownsey, JD, Breast Cancer Fund
Amy Kyle, Ph.D., MPH, UC Berkeley School of Public Health faculty
Ann Notthoff, MCRP, California Advocacy Director, Natural Resources Defense Council

On June 11, 2009 the second hearing for the Budget Conference committee was convened. OEHHA's item number was 3980 on the Agenda and included the recommendation from the Senate Environmental Quality Committee (below) to keep OEHHA intact and add risk assessment and hazard evaluation functions from the California Department of Pesticide Regulation and the California Department of Toxic Substances Control.  When OEHHA's item came up, Assemblymember Nielsen requested more time to review the proposal.  The committee decided to postpone the discussion and action of the OEHHA item, but did not say when the committee would revisit the OEHHA budget proposal.

On June 15, 2009 the Budget Conference Committee voted 6-4 along party lines to approve funding OEHHA's entire budget with fee- and penalty-based special funds.  The conference committee's plan will be considered by the full Assembly and Senate as part of the budget package.  The final ruling on OEHHA will not be available until after the budget is passed by the state legislature and signed by the Governor.  As of June 25, 2009, it does not appear that the Democratic budget plan will be passed.

Senate Environmental Quality Committee Hearing 
On June 10, 2009, The Senate Environmental Quality Committee voted to recommend that OEHHA be kept intact and expanded with the addition of California Department Pesticide Regulation's risk assessment activities, California Department of Toxic Substances Control's hazard evaluation functions, and lead roles in the children's health initiative and the Cal/EPA portion of the biomonitoring program. The recommendation will be forwarded to the Budget Conference Committee.

Public testimony and discussion on behalf of OEHHA continued for over an hour and included 16 people who spoke in favor of keeping OEHHA intact.   Two others spoke in opposition to transferring Department Pesticide Regulation's risk assessment activities to OEHHA, but neither of them commented on the larger issue of OEHHA's future.  The vote was 3-2. Senator Ashburn voted against the expansion recommendation but also said, "The expertise that resides in OEHHA ought not to be dissipated throughout state government as the Governor proposes."

Speakers in support of OEHHA included:
Bill Magavern, Sierra Club California
Dr. Amy Kyle, University of California, Berkeley School of Public Health
Dr. Sarah Janssen, Natural Resources Defense Council
Shankar Prasad, Coalition for Clean Air
Dr. Janice Kim, representing the American Academy of Pediatrics
Dr. Tracy Woodruff, Director, UCSF Program on Reproductive Health and the Environment
Andrea Ventura, Clean Water Action
Gretchen Lee, policy director of the Breast Cancer Fund
Lauren Ornelas, Silicon Valley Toxics Coalition
Martha Guzman, California Rural Legal Assistance
Suzanne Murphy, executive director of Worksafe
Bonnie Holmes-Gen, American Lung Association and California Thoracic Society
Kyle Gardner, Center for Environmental Health
Bill Allayaud, Environmental Working Group

Speakers against expansion of OEHHA:
Patrick Moran, legislative advocate, California Association of Professional Scientists
Justin Malan, California League of Conservation Voters

Purpose and goals
OEHHA's vision is to be California's leading scientific organization for evaluating risks to human and ecological health. OEHHA's goals as a governmental agency include:
 Improve the quality of the public's health and the environment
 Advance the science for the evaluation of risks posed to the public health and environment, and provide risk assessment leadership for the State of California
 Provide quality, useful, and equitable service to the public

Scientific responsibilities
OEHHA assesses the risk of environmental chemicals based on health considerations alone. In contrast, risk managers consider economic and technical feasibility as factors in their decisions. This separation is essential to prevent undue political influence on the evaluation of health risks. These factors are and should remain explicitly excluded from the assessment of risk. OEHHA plays a critical and unique role that allows for the separation of risk assessment and hazard evaluation from risk management with primary goal of protecting public health and the environment.

OEHHA's Top Ten
OEHHA' most recognizable contributions to public and environmental health are:

 OEHHA's groundbreaking work that showed that chromium in drinking water causes cancer; this issue was publicized in the movie Erin Brockovich.
 OEHHA's research was critical in passing legislation to ban toxic phthalates from children's toys in California.
 OEHHA was the first agency to identify second-hand tobacco smoke as a causal factor in breast cancer in young women.
 California's ban on two widely used toxic flame retardants was supported by OEHHA's research. The California ban led to these chemicals being phased out in the United States.
 In the face of strong opposition, OEHHA was the first government agency to establish that diesel exhaust causes cancer and induces asthma in children. OEHHA's work has led to stringent new controls on this widespread pollutant.
 OEHHA has compiled the most comprehensive list in the world of chemicals that cause cancer, infertility, birth defects (known as the Proposition 65 list). Governments throughout the world rely on this list to regulate toxic chemicals. Manufacturers of consumer products use the list to design safer consumer products.
 With OEHHA's ongoing support, the California Attorney General has led the way in removing lead from consumer products including venetian blinds, children's toys and jewelry, tableware, water faucets and ceramics. Other California success stories include reducing the use of toxic pesticides in flea collars and no-pest strips and removal of a cancer-causing chemical from office supplies.
 OEHHA maintains a list of hazardous arts and crafts supplies that contain toxic substances which pose health dangers to children. California elementary schools are prohibited from purchasing these materials.   OEHHA also provides advice on the selection and use of safer art supplies.
 OEHHA's research contributed to the phase-out of a toxic gasoline additive (MTBE) that contaminated groundwater throughout California.
 California was the first state to regulate a rocket fuel component which widely contaminates drinking water and produce including lettuce.   OEHHA's research provided the basis for this drinking water standard.

Traditional roles
OEHHA's work products cover a variety of environmental media. Traditionally OEHHA has focused on four primary areas:

Air pollution
 Health-based air quality standards for pollutants associated with smog
 Health effects assessments for toxic air contaminants.
 List of toxic air contaminants that disproportionately impact children
 Indoor air guidelines for green building

Water pollution
 Fish consumption advisories including warnings for pregnant women and children
 Health protective levels for contaminants found in drinking water

Proposition 65: Carcinogens and Reproductive Toxicants

 Maintain Proposition 65 list of chemicals known to be carcinogens and reproductive toxicants
 Health-based assessments of safe levels for Proposition 65 carcinogens and reproductive toxicants

Multimedia risk assessment
 Assess human and ecological health risk from exposure to chemicals contaminating California sites or facilities
 Multimedia evaluation of the health effects of fuels

More recently
In recent years OEHHA has taken on new mandates to address emerging environmental issues of particular concern to the California public:
 Biomonitoring – Evaluation of priority chemicals for Biomonitoring in California
 Green Chemistry – Identification of key hazards of chemicals for implementation of green chemistry laws
 Occupational health – Advice on health-based occupational exposure limits
 Dry Cleaning – Research on safer alternative methods for dry cleaning
 Environmental Justice
 Cumulative Impacts
 Emergency response for release of hazardous chemicals
 Evaluation of contamination from oil spills
 Evaluation of chemical sprays used to control invasive species
 Child-specific health-based reference doses used to evaluate toxic chemicals found at school sites
 Climate change – Identification of health effects
 Involved in the light brown apple moth controversy: Issued report on the complaints of adverse health effects after aerial spraying in Monterey and Santa Cruz.

Organizational structure
OEHHA has three main divisions:
 Administrative Support Services Division
 Office of External and Legislative Affairs
 Scientific Affairs Division

The Scientific Affairs division is composed of four scientific branches that correspond to the scientific duties:
 Air Toxicology and Epidemiology Branch
 Integrated Risk Assessment Branch
 Pesticide and Environmental Toxicology Branch
 Reproductive and Cancer Hazard Assessment Branch

Who uses OEHHA's science?
State agency users of information on issues of environmental and public health include:
 All six boards and departments within Cal/EPA
 California Department of Public Health
 California Department of Food and Agriculture
 California Office of Emergency Services
 California Department of Fish and Game
 California Department of Justice
 Federal agencies
 Scientific community including non-governmental organizations (NGOs)
 Industries in a range of disciplines
 General public

History
OEHHA was established in its current form by Governor Pete Wilson on July 17, 1991 with the creation of Cal/EPA.  OEHHA originated in the 1950s for air epidemiology in the Department of Public Health and developed over time with increased public awareness of the environment. OEHHA is the smallest of the six boards, departments and offices within Cal/EPA. OEHHA has no regulatory authority but remains the risk assessment and scientific arm of Cal/EPA and provides health-protective scientific guidance for Cal/EPA. Additionally, OEHHA is the lead agency for Proposition 65 implementation, a ballot measure approved in 1986, titled The Safe Drinking Water and Toxic Enforcement Act of 1986.
The highly experienced team of experts is well respected in the scientific community and has been built up over more than twenty years. The quality and depth of OEHHA's commitment to public health, the environment and sound science is illustrated by the scientific quality of the risk assessments produced.

OEHHA is headquartered in the Cal/EPA building in Sacramento and has an office in the Oakland Elihu Harris State Building. Before the state building was built, the Oakland office used to be located across from the University of California, Berkeley; OEHHA has maintained academic ties with this institution.

Employee composition
OEHHA's scientific responsibilities are fulfilled by a highly educated and trained professional staff of about 120 individuals. The staff include toxicologists, epidemiologists, biostatisticians and physicians; many have international reputations in their scientific fields. In fiscal year 2007–2008 OEHHA was budgeted for approximately $17.5 million or 1/500th of 1% the state General Fund; $8 million is from the general fund.

References

External links
Oehha.ca.gov: Official California Office of Environmental Health Hazard Assessment website
Oehha.ca.gov: "About the California OEHHA—Office of Environmental Health Hazard Assessment"

Office Of Environmental Health
Environment of California
Environmental Health Hazard Assessment
Office of Environmental Health
Office Of Environmental Health